The Marangoni effect (also called the Gibbs–Marangoni effect) is the mass transfer along an interface between two phases due to a gradient of the surface tension. In the case of temperature dependence, this phenomenon may be called thermo-capillary convection (or Bénard–Marangoni convection).

History
This phenomenon was first identified in the so-called "tears of wine" by physicist James Thomson (Lord Kelvin's brother) in 1855. The general effect is named after Italian physicist Carlo Marangoni, who studied it for his doctoral dissertation at the University of Pavia and published his results in 1865. A complete theoretical treatment of the subject was given by J. Willard Gibbs in his work On the Equilibrium of Heterogeneous Substances (1875-8).

Mechanism

Since a liquid with a high surface tension pulls more strongly on the surrounding liquid than one with a low surface tension, the presence of a gradient in surface tension will naturally cause the liquid to flow away from regions of low surface tension. The surface tension gradient can be caused by concentration gradient or by a temperature gradient (surface tension is a function of temperature).

Water has a surface tension of around 0.07 N/m, and a viscosity of approximately 10−3 Pa s, at room temperature. So even variations of a few percent in the surface tension of water can generate Marangoni flows of almost 1 m/s. Thus Marangoni flows are common and easily observed.

For the case of a small drop of surfactant dropped onto the surface of water, Roché and coworkers performed quantitative experiments and developed a simple model that was in approximate agreement with the experiments. This described the expansion in the radius  of a patch of the surface covered in surfactant, due to an outward Marangoni flow at a speed . They found that speed of expansion of the surfactant-covered patch of the water surface occurred at speed of approximately

for  the surface tension of water, the (lower) surface tension of the surfactant-covered water surface,  the viscosity of water, and  the mass density of water. For  N/m, i.e., of order tens of per cent reduction in surface tension of water, and as for water  N m−6s3, we obtain the second equality above. This gives speeds that decrease as surfactant-covered region grows, but are of order cms/s to mm/s.

The equation is obtained by making a couple of simple approximations, the first is by equating the stress at the surface due to the concentration gradient of surfactant (which drives the Marangoni flow) with the viscous stresses (that oppose flow). The Marangoni stress , i.e., gradient in the surface tension due gradient in the surfactant concentration (from high in the centre of the expanding patch, to zero far from the patch). The viscous shear stress is simply the viscosity times the gradient in shear velocity , for  the depth into the water of the flow due to the spreading patch. Equating the two stresses

where we approximated the gradient . Taking the 2/3 power of both sides gives the expression above.

The Marangoni number, a dimensionless value, can be used to characterize the relative effects of surface tension and viscous forces.

Tears of wine 

As an example, wine may exhibit a visible effect called "tears of wine". The effect is a consequence of the fact that alcohol has a lower surface tension and higher volatility than water. The water/alcohol solution rises up the surface of the glass lowering the surface energy of the glass. Alcohol evaporates from the film leaving behind liquid with a higher surface tension (more water, less alcohol). This region with a lower concentration of alcohol (greater surface tension) pulls on the surrounding fluid more strongly than the regions with a higher alcohol concentration (lower in the glass). The result is the liquid is pulled up until its own weight exceeds the force of the effect, and the liquid drips back down the vessel's walls. This can also be easily demonstrated by spreading a thin film of water on a smooth surface and then allowing a drop of alcohol to fall on the center of the film. The liquid will rush out of the region where the drop of alcohol fell.

Significance to transport phenomena

Under earth conditions, the effect of gravity causing natural convection in a system with a temperature gradient along a fluid/fluid interface is usually much stronger than the Marangoni effect. Many experiments (ESA MASER 1-3) have been conducted under microgravity conditions aboard sounding rockets to observe the Marangoni effect without the influence of gravity. Research on heat pipes performed on the International Space Station revealed that whilst heat pipes exposed to a temperature gradient on Earth cause the inner fluid to evaporate at one end and migrate along the pipe, thus drying the hot end, in space (where the effects of gravity can be ignored) the opposite happens and the hot end of the pipe is flooded with liquid. This is due to the Marangoni effect, together with capillary action. The fluid is drawn to the hot end of the tube by capillary action. But the bulk of the liquid still ends up as a droplet a short distance away from the hottest part of the tube, explained by Marangoni flow. The temperature gradients in axial and radial directions makes the fluid flow away from the hot end and the walls of the tube, towards the center axis. The liquid forms a droplet with a small contact area with the tube walls, a thin film circulating liquid between the cooler droplet and the liquid at the hot end.

The effect of the Marangoni effect on heat transfer in the presence of gas bubbles on the heating surface (e.g., in subcooled nucleate boiling) has long been ignored, but it is currently a topic of ongoing research interest because of its potential fundamental importance to the understanding of heat transfer in boiling.

Examples and application
A familiar example is in soap films: the Marangoni effect stabilizes soap films. Another instance of the Marangoni effect appears in the behavior of convection cells, the so-called Bénard cells.

One important application of the Marangoni effect is the use for drying silicon wafers after a wet processing step during the manufacture of integrated circuits. Liquid spots left on the wafer surface can cause oxidation that damages components on the wafer. To avoid spotting, an alcohol vapor (IPA) or other organic compound in gas, vapor, or aerosol form is blown through a nozzle over the wet wafer surface (or at the meniscus formed between the cleaning liquid and wafer as the wafer is lifted from an immersion bath), and the subsequent Marangoni effect causes a surface-tension gradient in the liquid allowing gravity to more easily pull the liquid completely off the wafer surface, effectively leaving a dry wafer surface.

A similar phenomenon has been creatively utilized to self-assemble nanoparticles into ordered arrays and to grow ordered nanotubes. An alcohol containing nanoparticles is spread on the substrate, followed by blowing humid air over the substrate. The alcohol is evaporated under the flow. Simultaneously, water condenses and forms microdroplets on the substrate. Meanwhile, the nanoparticles in alcohol are transferred into the microdroplets and finally form numerous coffee rings on the substrate after drying.

Another application is the manipulation of particles taking advantage of the relevance of the surface tension effects at small scales. A controlled thermo-capillary convection is created by locally heating the air–water interface using an infrared laser. Then, this flow is used to control floating objects in both position and orientation and can prompt the self-assembly of floating objects, profiting from the Cheerios effect.

The Marangoni effect is also important to the fields of welding, crystal growth and electron beam melting of metals.

See also 
 Plateau–Rayleigh instability — an instability in a stream of liquid
 Diffusioosmosis - the Marangoni effect is flow at a fluid/fluid interface due to a gradient in the interfacial free energy, the analog at a fluid/solid interface is diffusioosmosis

References

External links 
 Motoring Oil Drops Physical Review Focus February 22, 2005
 Thin Film Physics, ISS astronaut Don Pettit demonstrate. YouTube-movie.

Fluid mechanics
Convection
Physical phenomena
Articles containing video clips